The Yamatari glacier valley is located in Taplejung district. The glacier extends from 4050 m and 3900 m. It was formed during the neoglacial age. The glacier have a length of about 10 to 12 km. The Yamatari  glacier  terminates at and elevation of about 4200 m. Yamatari glacier joins Ghunsa valley at an elevation of about 3500 m just below the settlement at Ghunsa village.

References

Glaciers of Nepal